Giulio Sabbi (born 10 August 1989) is an Italian volleyball player, a former member of the Italy men's national volleyball team, silver medalist of the 2015 World Cup, medalist of the European Championship (silver in 2011, bronze in 2015), medalist of the World League and World Grand Champions Cup.

References

External links
 Giulio Sabbi at Lega Pallavolo Serie A
 

1989 births
Living people
Sportspeople from the Metropolitan City of Rome Capital
Italian men's volleyball players
Italian expatriate sportspeople in China
Italian expatriate sportspeople in France
Expatriate volleyball players in China
Expatriate volleyball players in France
Mediterranean Games gold medalists for Italy
Mediterranean Games medalists in volleyball
Competitors at the 2013 Mediterranean Games
Opposite hitters